Iran was supposed to participate in the 2021 Islamic Solidarity Games held in Konya, Turkey from 9 to 18 August 2022. The Games were rescheduled from 20 to 29 August 2021 at first, but the event was further postponed to be held from 10 to 19 September 2021 in July 2020 by the ISSF, because the original dates were coinciding with the 2020 Summer Olympics, which were postponed due to the COVID-19 pandemic. In May 2021, the ISSF postponed the event to August 2022 citing the COVID-19 pandemic situation in the participating countries.

Medalists

Competitors

Archery 

Individual

Teams

Athletics 

Track Events

Field Events

3×3 Basketball

Men's 3x3 tournament
Group B

Quarterfinal

Semifinal

Bronze medal match

Women's 3x3 tournament
Group D

Quarterfinal

Cycling

Road

Track

Scratch

Pursuit

Points Race

Omnium

Fencing 

Men

Women

Gymnastics 

Artistic Gymnastics

Aerobic Gymnastics

Handball

Men's tournament

Summary

Group B

Semifinal

Bronze medal game

Women's tournament

Summary

Group B

Fifth place game

Judo

Men

Women

Karate

Men

Women

Para Archery 

Individual

Team

Para Swimming 

Men

Para Table tennis 

Individual

Shooting

Swimming

Table tennis 

Singles

Teams

Taekwondo

Men

Women

Volleyball

Men's tournament

Summary

Pool B

|}

Semifinal

|}

Gold medal match

|}

Women's tournament
Summary

Pool A

|}

Semifinal

|}

Gold medal match

|}

Weightlifting

Men

Women

Wrestling 

Men's freestyle

Men's Greco-Roman

References

Nations at the 2021 Islamic Solidarity Games
2021
Islamic Solidarity Games